Carex vulpina, the true fox sedge, is a species in the genus Carex, native to Europe and western Asia. It is difficult to distinguish it from its close relative Carex otrubae, false fox sedge.

References

vulpina
Taxa named by Carl Linnaeus
Plants described in 1753